Hypogymnia australica is a species of foliose lichen in the family Parmeliaceae. Found in Australia, it was formally described as a new species by lichenologist John Elix in 1989. Here it was found growing on a species of Leptospermum.

It contains the secondary compounds atranorin, chloroatranorin, and physodic acid as major metabolites.

References

australica
Lichen species
Lichens described in 1989
Lichens of Australia
Taxa named by John Alan Elix